The Chief Minister of North Central Province, Sri Lanka is the head of the provincial board of ministers, a body which aids and advises the governor, the head of the provincial government, in the exercise of his executive power. The governor appoints as chief minister the member of the North Central Provincial Council who, in his opinion, commands the support of a majority of that council. The current chief minister is Peshala Jayarathne.

Chief ministers

References

External links
 

 
North Central